TCG Demirhisar was the name ship of the four her class of destroyers built for the Turkish Navy during the Second World War. The design of her class was based on the British .

Description
Steam for the turbines was provided by three Admiralty three-drum boilers. The ship's complement was 145 officers and ratings.

The ship mounted four 45-calibre 4.7-inch (120 mm) Mark IX guns in single mounts. For anti-aircraft (AA) defence, Demirhisar had four single mounts for Oerlikon 20 mm cannon. She was fitted with two above-water quadruple mounts for  torpedoes.

Construction and career
Demirhisar was one of four I-class destroyers ordered by Turkey in 1939, two of which were purchased by the Royal Navy while construction of the other two proceeded slowly. The ship was laid down at William Denny and Brothers in Dumbarton, Scotland, in 1939. She was launched two years later, and completed in 1942. The destroyer was transferred to Turkey in later that year, where she served until her decommissioning in 1960.

Notes

References

 

Ships built on the River Clyde
1941 ships
World War II destroyers of Turkey